The 1947 Stanford Indians football team was an American football team that represented Stanford University in the Pacific Coast Conference (PCC) during the 1947 college football season. In its third year under head coach Marchmont Schwartz, the team compiled a 0–9 record, finished last in the PCC, and was outscored by a total of 214 to 73.

The 1947 season was one of two winless season in the history of Stanford football (the other was the 1960 season).

The team played its home games at Stanford Stadium in Stanford, California.

Schedule

Players drafted by the NFL

References

Stanford
Stanford Cardinal football seasons
College football winless seasons
Stanford Indians football